The Sound Behind Johnny Cash is the only album released by Johnny Cash's band, The Tennessee Three. It contains instrumental versions of 11 Johnny Cash hits.

Track listing
Side one
"A Boy Named Sue"
"Daddy Sang Bass"
"Folsom Prison Blues"
"I Walk the Line"
"Understand Your Man"
"Ring of Fire"

Side two
"Wreck of the Old '97"
"Cry, Cry, Cry"
"I Still Miss Someone"
"Tennessee Flat Top Box"
"Forty Shades of Green"

Personnel
 Marshall Grant – upright bass
 W.S. Holland – drums
 Bob Wootton – electric guitar

Johnny Cash
1972 debut albums
Columbia Records albums
Instrumental albums
The Tennessee Three albums